President Castro may refer to:
Cipriano Castro, President of Venezuela from 1899 to 1908
Fidel Castro, President of Cuba from 1976 to 2008
José María Castro Madriz, President of Costa Rica from 1847 to 1849
Julián Castro (Venezuelan politician), President of Venezuela between 1858 and 1859
Raúl Castro, President of Cuba from 2008 to 2018
Xiomara Castro, President of Honduras from 2022 to present